El Tahrir Aswan Sporting Club, is an Egyptian football club based in Aswan, Egypt. The club plays in the Egyptian Second Division, the second-highest league in the Egyptian football league system.

References 

Egyptian Second Division
Football clubs in Egypt